Eupithecia costimacularia is a moth in the  family Geometridae. It is found in Japan and Taiwan.

References

Moths described in 1897
costimacularia
Moths of Asia